Business Sweden's purpose is to help Swedish companies to grow their global sales and international companies to invest and expand in Sweden. .The organisation has two owners: The Government of Sweden and the private business sector in Sweden. The government is represented by the Ministry of Foreign Affairs (Swedish: Utrikesdepartementet) and the business sector by the Swedish Foreign Trade Association. The CEO of Business Sweden is Jan Larsson.

About Business Sweden 
Business Sweden was founded on 1 January 2013 through a merger of the Swedish Trade Council. and Invest Sweden. 

Business Sweden has 44 offices in four regions: Europe, the Americas, Asia Pacific, and the Middle East and Africa. Its headquarters is located in Stockholm. Most of its more than 500 employees work in international offices in close cooperation with Swedish embassies, consulates, chambers of commerce, companies, and other local networks.  

The organisation has a strong presence in Sweden, with 16 offices from north to south. Its global business developers in Sweden work directly with the internationalisation of companies, from education and inspiration to practical advice. At the head office in Stockholm, it has a number of export and investment experts who can help companies with advice and market information.

History 
When the organization was formed, Ulf Berg became CEO. He had previously led the Export Council since 2003. Berg was forced to resign after only nine months in the new organization, and was succeeded on April 1, 2014 by Ylva Berg. Ylva Berg's time as CEO began with a dismissal of 30 percent of the staff, and in 2020, 40 percent of the employees were dismissed again. In March 2021, Ylva Berg was succeeded as CEO by Jan Larsson, former head of information at Handelsbanken.

References

External links

Business Sweden - Official site (English)

Government of Sweden
Economy of Sweden
Investment promotion agencies
Business organizations based in Sweden
2013 establishments in Sweden
Organizations established in 2013